Tiki-100 was a desktop home/personal computer manufactured by Tiki Data of Oslo, Norway.  The computer was launched in the spring of 1984 under the original name Kontiki-100, and was first and foremost intended for the emerging educational sector, especially for primary schools. Early prototypes had 4 KB ROM, and the '100' in the machine's name was based on the total KB amount of memory.

Development
It was decided by the Norwegian government that Norwegian schools should all use the same standardized computer in education. The Tiki-100 was developed as a direct response to this decision, and was as such greatly influenced by the specifications laid out by the government. One of the most influential of these specifications was compatibility with CP/M and the Z80 CPU.

Being designed as a computer intended for education, interactivity was prioritized. The machine was given good audiovisual capabilities for its time. While other educational computers at the time had a main focus on BASIC and simple computer-science, the Tiki-100 had more focus on being a tool to aid in education and everyday-life situations. This put forth the need and memory requirements to run more complex applications.

The first prototype was built using wire-wrap and a bigger prototype case. Soon followed a prototype made on PCB, and there were very little changes from this prototype to the final product. The most significant changes was the change from Siemens keyboard switches to cheaper Sasse switches, along with the re-arranging of the analog video output connection. Very few, if any, revision A or B Tiki-100 computers ever hit the store shelves.

Tiki-100 was released under the original name 'Kontiki-100' in the spring of 1984. Thor Heyerdahl threatened to open a legal case on the use of the Kontiki name, with reference to the name of his famous raft. The name was changed to "Tiki-100" as a result. Around the same time, Computerworld magazine claimed the operating system "KP/M" was a direct copy of CP/M, due to KP/M being able to run CP/M software. As a response to these claims, KP/M was renamed "Tiko" to avoid direct association to CP/M and Digital Research.

Specifications
Specifications for the basic Tiki-100 model:
CPU: Zilog Z80 running at 4 MHz.
Memory: 64 KB of RAM (main memory), 32 KB of graphical memory and 8 KB of ROM. 
keyboard: A n-key rollover mechanical keyboard integrated into the computer case
Graphics: PAL-compatible, based on discrete TTL components. Bitmap graphics with a 256-color palette, supporting 3 different resolutions with 256x256x16 colours, 512x256x4 colours or 1024x256x2 simultaneous colours. The has no text-mode as it used bitmapped graphics only. However, terminal emulators provided options of 40, 80 or 160 by 25 characters, each option using one of the three modes. All of the graphics modes have hardware vertical scroll.
Audio: An AY-3-8912 polyphonic sound generator
Storage: One or two integrated 5¼ inch floppy disk drives
Interfaces: Two RS-232 serial ports, One Centronics printer port

Software included:
TIKO, a CP/M 2.2-compatible operating system
A version of the BBC BASIC programming language interpreter
A COMAL interpreter

Optional expansions:
 A harddisk controller, replacing one of the floppy disk stations with a 8MB harddisk.
 A bespoke network-hub that allowed up to 16 computers to connect in a network, sharing disks and printers. The server was a Tiki-100 with harddisk, running the MP/M operating system, serving up to 3 different printers simultaneously.

8/16 upgrade 
An 8/16 upgrade was possible, consisting of a secondary CPU card with a 4 MHz 8088 processor. With this upgrade the machine is capable of running TIKOS(a CP/M-86 clone) and MS-DOS 2.11, with RAM being expanded up to 736 KB. Although running MS-DOS, the expansion does not provide PC-compatibility. When programs are running on the 8088, the Z80 CPU is serving as an I/O processor, handling disk I/O, graphics etc.

Rev. D 
Later, an Intel 8088 based IBM PC compatible model running MS-DOS was made, somewhat confusingly called Tiki-100 Rev. D. In addition to being PC-compatible (including CGA-compatible graphics), it also contained a Z80 processor so that it could run the original Tiki 100 software, although with a slightly reduced graphics specification due to the CGA. The two processors shared the same bus, and the Z80 programs still ran under the 8088 operating system.

Tiki-200 
After the commercial failure of the Tiki-100 rev. D, it was succeeded by the Tiki-200. This was a standard IBM PC-clone, with imported hardware which did not make any attempt at maintaining backward-compatibility with the Tiki-100. Despite these attempts at adapting to the personal-computer market, due to steep competition Tiki-Data was unable to maintain a stable foothold in it and went into gradual decline. In 1996 the company along with its deficit was bought by Merkantildata.

References

External links
Tiki 100 
Details about Tiki 100 including an emulator

Z80-based home computers
8086-based home computers
Norwegian brands
Computer-related introductions in 1984
1984 establishments in Norway
Goods manufactured in Norway